Roberto Alexander Hernández Maldonado (born 9 January 1989) is a Salvadoran archer competing in men's compound events. He won the gold medal in the men's individual compound event at the 2019 Pan American Games held in Lima, Peru. As a result, he became the first man from El Salvador to win gold at the Pan American Games. He was the flag bearer during the Parade of Nations at the 2019 Pan American Games opening ceremony.

In 2013, he represented El Salvador at the World Games in Cali, Colombia and he won the bronze medal in the men's compound event. He also competed at the 2017 World Games in Wrocław, Poland without winning a medal. He represented El Salvador at the 2022 World Games held in Birmingham, United States. He competed in the men's individual compound and mixed team compound events.

References

External links 
 

Living people
1989 births
Place of birth missing (living people)
Salvadoran male archers
Archers at the 2019 Pan American Games
Medalists at the 2019 Pan American Games
Pan American Games gold medalists for the United States
Pan American Games medalists in archery
Central American and Caribbean Games medalists in archery
Central American and Caribbean Games gold medalists for El Salvador
Competitors at the 2018 Central American and Caribbean Games
World Games medalists in archery
World Games bronze medalists
Competitors at the 2013 World Games
Competitors at the 2017 World Games
Competitors at the 2022 World Games
20th-century Salvadoran people
21st-century Salvadoran people